Howard McGillin (born November 5, 1953, in Los Angeles, California) is an American actor. He is known for his role of John Jasper in The Mystery of Edwin Drood and for portraying the role The Phantom in Andrew Lloyd Webber's The Phantom of the Opera.

Biography

Early life and career
McGillin was born in Los Angeles, California. His father William was an accountant, and his mother Margaret was an administrator at Santa Barbara City College. McGillin graduated from Dos Pueblos High School and the University of California, Santa Barbara. While in college, he appeared at the Sacramento Music Circus in seven musicals.

He began his career on television, working as a contract player for Universal Studios, and his early film and TV credits include roles in McMillan & Wife (1976), The Six Million Dollar Man (2 episodes, 1976), Emergency! (2 episodes, 1976 and 1977), The Bionic Woman (2 episodes, 1976), The Rockford Files (1977), Columbo (1977), Mary White (1977), Wheels (1978), Women in White (1979) and Where the Boys Are '84 (1984). He moved to New York City with the intention of pursuing a career on Broadway, and was cast as one of the male leads in the New York Shakespeare Festival's 1984 production of La Boheme, which starred Linda Ronstadt. The New York Times reviewer, Frank Rich, called McGillin "dashing".

Career
Other featured and leading roles on the stage followed. Often considered a "tall, dark and handsome" leading man, McGillin originated the role of John Jasper in The Mystery of Edwin Drood at the Imperial Theatre; for his performance he was nominated for a 1986 Tony Award for Best Featured Actor in a Musical. He earned a second Tony nomination in 1988 for his portrayal of Billy Crocker in the Broadway revival of Cole Porter's Anything Goes.

McGillin starred in the award-winning West End 1995 production of Mack & Mabel and sings on the cast album recording. He received praise as Molina in the Kander and Ebb musical Kiss of the Spider Woman, replacing Brent Carver in 1994.

The New York Times reviewer wrote: "In an impressive change of pace from the smooth philanderer he played in 'She Loves Me,' Howard McGillin is Molina...Mr. McGillin can be almost boyishly blithe at times. He embraces Aurora's campy films with the flair of the musical-comedy aficionado...While Mr. McGillin is playing up Molina's more exuberant charm, Mr. [Brian Stokes] Mitchell is playing down Valentin's brusque condescension. As a result, the growing affection between them seems the more believable." Due to their performances and that of leading lady Vanessa Williams, the show received a rare second cast recording.
 
McGillin originated a leading role in the world premiere of Stephen Sondheim's musical Bounce at the Goodman Theatre, Chicago, and the Kennedy Center in 2003. He was featured in the Encores! production of the Ziegfeld Follies of 1936 in 1999.

He appeared in the Irish Repertory Theatre (New York City) concert, A Child's Christmas in Wales in Concert in December 2011.

McGillin has continued to perform in television and film as a voice-over artist. His is the singing voice of Gregory in South Park: Bigger, Longer & Uncut, has narrated many books on tape, and programs/commercials on television (including the PBS series Nature). He voiced Prince Derek in the animated film The Swan Princess (1994). McGillin has released one solo CD, Where Time Stands Still. He has contributed to numerous cast recordings, including those of The Mystery of Edwin Drood, Anything Goes, and Bounce.

McGillin holds the record for the most performances by an actor in the title role of the Broadway production of the musical The Phantom of the Opera, joining the Broadway cast in 1999. He was part of the musical when it became the longest-running production in Broadway history on January 9, 2006, and its twenty-first anniversary on January 26, 2009. McGillin played his last performance in the role on July 25, 2009, marking his 2,544th show.

He performed in the York Theatre production of I Remember Mama, which ran from October 8–10, 2010.

McGillin starred as Sir Francis Chesney in the New York City Center Encores! production of Where's Charley? from March 17–20, 2011. He played Applegate in the Paper Mill Playhouse production of Damn Yankees! in Millburn, New Jersey, which ran from March 7, 2012, through April 1, 2012.

Personal life
McGillin married longtime partner Richard Samson in September 2013; he had been married and divorced prior to this. McGillin has two sons, Brian and Christopher.

Selected stage credits

Broadway
Source: Playbill Vault

Sunday in the Park with George (Soldier/Alex, u/s Georges/George replacement)
The Mystery of Edwin Drood (John Jasper) (1985): Tony Award nomination; Drama Desk Award nomination; Theatre World Award
Anything Goes (Billy Crocker) (1987): Tony Award nomination; Drama Desk Award nomination
The Secret Garden (Archibald Craven replacement)
She Loves Me (Kodaly) (1993-1994)
Kiss of the Spider Woman (Molina replacement) (1994)
Sunday in the Park with George (1994 Concert) (Soldier/Alex)
The Phantom of the Opera (The Phantom of the Opera replacement) (1999- July 25, 2009) (Longest running Phantom, in Broadway history)
Gigi (2015) (Honoré Lachaille)
Parade (2023) (Old Soldier/Judge Roan)

West End
Anything Goes (Billy Crocker) (1989)
Mack & Mabel (Mack) (1995)

Other
 As Thousands Cheer (June 1998) (Drama Dept., Off-Broadway)
 Ziegfeld Follies of 1936 (Encores!, 1999)
 Bounce (2003 world premiere: Helen Hayes Award nomination)
 Peter Pan (2004 national tour) (Captain Hook)
  A Child's Christmas in Wales (Concert, December 2011)
  Where's Charley? (Sir Francis Chesney) (Encores!, 2011)
  Damn Yankees! (Paper Mill Playhouse, March 2012)

References

External links
Howard McGillin's Official Website

Biography at Playbill.com
"A Veteran Phantom Embraces "The Music of the Night" Once Again Oct. 3" Kenneth Jones, Playbill.com, October 3, 2005
Howard McGillin: Interview by Ladyghost

Male actors from California
University of California, Santa Barbara alumni
American baritones
American male musical theatre actors
American male television actors
American male voice actors
1953 births
Living people
American gay actors
LGBT people from California